Sergei Petrovich Studennikov (1966/1967) is a Russian billionaire businessman, the founder and owner of the discount liquor store chain Red&White.

Early life
Studennikov was born into a poor family in the village of Levokumsky, and grew up in the town of Bakal.

Career
Studennikov opened his first liquor store in Chelyabinsk.

As of October 2018, Red&White has 6,700 outlets, and is the "fastest-growing major retailer" in Russia.

As of October 2018, Bloomberg LP estimated Studennikov's net worth at over US$1 billion.

References

1960s births
Living people
Russian company founders
Russian billionaires